The Brisas mine is one of the largest gold mines in Venezuela and in the world. The mine is located in the Orinoco Arc in the center of the country in Bolívar. The mine has estimated reserves of 10.2 million oz of gold.

References 

Gold mines in Venezuela
Buildings and structures in Bolívar (state)